The CEC Palace in Bucharest, Romania, built between 8 June 1897 and 1900, and situated on Calea Victoriei opposite the National Museum of Romanian History, is the headquarters of CEC Bank.

History

Before the construction of the palace, the location was occupied by the ruins of a monastery (Saint John the Great) and an adjoining inn. The 16th-century church was renovated by Constantin Brâncoveanu between 1702 and 1703, but later deteriorated and was demolished in 1875.

The palace was built as a new headquarters for Romania's oldest bank, the public savings institution Casa de Depuneri, Consemnațiuni și Economie, later known as C.E.C. (Romanian: Casa de Economii și Consemnațiuni), and nowadays CEC Bank. The land was bought and the building constructed with the institution's own funds. Work started on June 8, 1897 and was completed in 1900. The project was designed by the architect Paul Gottereau, a graduate of the École nationale supérieure des Beaux-Arts in Paris; construction was supervised by the Romanian architect Ion Socolescu.

In 2009, it was the venue for the 60th birthday celebrations of Crown Princess Margareta of Romania, and in 2015 it was also the venue for the 25th anniversary of the celebration of Crown Princess Margareta's charity (FPMR).

Architecture 

Built in eclectic style, the palace is topped by a glass and metal dome. The entrance features an arch supported by two pairs of columns in composite style. The four corners are decorated with gables and coats of arms and ending in Renaissance domes.

See also
List of palaces

References

 Silvia Colfescu, București - ghid turistic, istoric, artistic, ed. Vremea, 2006
 Dan Berindei, Sebastian Bonifaciu - București Ghid turistic, Ed. Sport-Turism, București,1980

External links

 Map of Historical Monuments in Bucharest

Palaces in Bucharest
Commercial buildings completed in 1900
Historic monuments in Bucharest
Calea Victoriei
Lipscani